William B. Shires (June 9, 1858 – January 29, 1926), who performed and recorded as Billy Golden, was an American blackface comic, and singer who was a popular recording artist between the 1890s and the 1910s.

Biography
He was born in Cincinnati, Ohio, and grew up in St Louis, Missouri. He began performing as a blackface act in vaudeville in 1874 before working as a duo with, first, John Merritt, and then Billy Draiton. He originated a dance move known as the "cane pat" which became popular with blackface minstrels, and, as part of Bailess and Kennedy's "Brightlights" vaudeville act, became particularly associated with the song "Turkey in the Straw". In 1885, he started performing in a duo with his wife, May Golden.

In 1891, he recorded "Turkey in the Straw" for Columbia Records; it became one of the best-selling recordings of the year. He re-recorded the piece many times for Berliner (as well as their successor company Victor), Zonophone, Edison and many others . Other successful recordings by Golden included "Uncle Jefferson" (1891), "Rabbit Hash" (1895), "Bye Bye, My Honey" (1898), "Yaller Gal" (1899), and "Roll On The Ground" (1901). Most of his early recordings were as a solo performer besides some recordings under the "Spencer Trio" in which he recorded alongside Len Spencer, George J. Gaskin, and George P. Watson. In 1907 he formed a new duo act with Joe Hughes, and they recorded together for several labels. Golden and Hughes were among the first two-man teams to record blackface minstrel humor in black dialect. The two would also have success and popularity in vaudeville as well.

After Hughes retired from performing, Golden began working with James Marlowe and then, after Marlowe's death in 1917, with Billy Heins. In 1919, Golden reunited with Hughes for several more recordings. Afterwards, he continued to record and perform as a solo act. 

Golden died in New York City on January 29, 1926, at the age of 67. He was buried in Kensico Cemetery.

References

External links
 Billy Golden recordings at the Discography of American Historical Recordings.
Billy Golden cylinder recordings, from the UCSB Cylinder Audio Archive at the University of California, Santa Barbara Library.
Billy Golden at Discogs.com

1858 births
1926 deaths
Musicians from Cincinnati
Columbia Records artists
Blackface minstrel performers
Pioneer recording artists
19th-century American singers
Burials at Kensico Cemetery